Cozinha Sob Pressão (Kitchen Under Pressure) is a Brazilian competitive cooking reality show airing  on SBT during the 2014–15 Brazilian television season. It is based on the British series Hell's Kitchen.

Chefs compete against each other in cooking challenges designated by celebrity chef Carlos Bertolazzi in order to win the R$100,000 cash prize.

The series premiered on October 11, 2014.

1st season

Contestants
Biographical information according to SBT's official website.
(ages stated at the start of the contest)

Contestant progress

Key

Ratings

Brazilian ratings
All ratings are in points and are provided by IBOPE.

References

External links
 Cozinha Sob Pressão on SBT.com
 
 

2014 Brazilian television series debuts
2016 Brazilian television series endings
Brazilian reality television series
Brazilian television series based on British television series
Hell's Kitchen (TV series)
Portuguese-language television shows
Sistema Brasileiro de Televisão original programming